is a Nippon Professional Baseball player for the Yomiuri Giants.

External links

Living people
1984 births
Baseball people from Saitama (city)
Chuo University alumni
Nippon Professional Baseball pitchers
Yomiuri Giants players
Japanese baseball coaches
Nippon Professional Baseball coaches
Japanese expatriate baseball players in the Dominican Republic
Leones del Escogido players